Captain John Barneson was one of the most important figures in commerce and development on the Pacific Coast of California. He was responsible for the first oil pipeline in the State of California and was the Founder of General Petroleum which he later sold to Standard Oil of New York. Captain Barneson was a Director and Vice President of Standard Oil after the merger.

Captain Barneson was also a pioneer in the use of oil as a fuel for ocean steamers. He was one of the most popular social and business figures in the early 1900s and helped transform the economy of California.

In his memoirs Herbert Hoover wrote: 
The matter was not itself so important but it brought me the acquaintance of Captain John Barneson, the president of General Petroleum. Captain John was one of the choice souls in American life. Honest, courageous, frank, generous and loyal, and with a high quality of humor, he had started before the mast; risen to command a naval supply ship in the Spanish–American War; gone into the shipping business for himself; thence into oil fuel business; from there finally into oil production, where he built up the General Petroleum Company to a great industry." (The Memoirs of Herbert Hoover, pg 111)

Career at sea 
 Served as First officer of the bark "Wollahra" from 1880-1883
 Received his Captain's papers in 1883
 Commanded the English Clipper Ship "George Thompson" from 1885-1890
 Retired from the sea in 1890 
 Entered the service of the U.S. Government at the outbreak of the Spanish–American War and commanded the USAT Arizona
 Appointed "Marine Superintendent" by the U.S. Government, in which he oversaw all vessels involved in the transportation of troops into the Pacific

Personal life 

Captain Barneson was the son of James Barneson and Elizabeth Rose Bremner Barneson.  He married Harriet Emily Harris in Sydney, Australia on January 8, 1886.  They had four children; John Leslie Barneson, Muriel E. Barneson, Lionel T. Barneson and Harold James Barneson (b. 1896 Port, WA, d. 1945 Los Angeles, CA).

He received his education in the public schools of New South Wales.

Affiliations 

 American Institute of Mining Engineers
 Panama Pacific Expedition Board Member
 General Petroleum Founder and Managing Director
 General Pipe Line Company Founder and President
 General Construction Company President
 Wabash Oil Company President
 Las Flores Land and Oil Company President
 Coalinga Kettlemen Oil Company Vice President
 Sauer Dough Oil Company Director
 Bankline Oil Company President
 Union Oil Company Director
 Union Provident Director
 San Vincent Land Company
 Santa Barbara Improvement Company
 Residential Development Company
 San Mateo Improvement Company
 San Mateo Hotel Company President
 Barneson-Hibberd Co-Founder
 Barneson-Hibberd Warehouse Company Co-Founder
 Macondray & Company
 Tyee Whaling Company
 San Francisco Chamber of Commerce Director
 Seattle Yacht Club Member
 Northwest International Yachting Association Commodore 1893
 San Francisco Yacht Club Member
 St. Francis Yacht Club Member
 Pacific Union Club Member
 Union League Club Member
 Olympic Club Member
 Press Club Member
 Bohemian Club Member
 Commercial Club Member
 California Club of Los Angeles Member
 San Mateo Polo Club Vice President

References 

 Press Reference Library, "Portraits and Biographies of Men of the West", by International News Service
 The Memoirs of Herbert Hoover, Years of Adventure 1874-1920 
 From the Garage to the Boardroom, National Commission on Entrepreneurship 
 Torrance Refinery

1862 births
1941 deaths
Founders of the petroleum industry
American company founders
British emigrants to the United States